Lakeshore State Park is a  Wisconsin state park located on the shores of Lake Michigan in the city of Milwaukee. It is situated adjacent to both Discovery World and Henry Maier Festival Park. It is the only urban state park in Wisconsin and features restored prairie and a pebble beach. In addition to the prairie, portions of the park are planted with Kentucky bluegrass.

The park has a paved trail that connects to both the Hank Aaron State Trail and the Oak Leaf Trail. The park features a fishing pier overlooking a basin, on the side opposite Lake Michigan. There are also boat slips at the north end of the park that can be used overnight. The park itself is perched atop an artificial bed of limestone rock material removed from the Deep Tunnel Project in the 1980s.

In the 1990s, the peninsula was known informally as Harbor Island or Summerfest Island. It was set aside for "public use and enjoyment" by Milwaukee mayor John Norquist in October 1991, 16 years before becoming a state park.

See also
 Parks of Milwaukee
 Henry Maier Festival Park, located directly west across a lagoon

References

External links
Lakeshore State Park official site
Friends of Lakeshore State Park official site

Geography of Milwaukee
State parks of Wisconsin
Protected areas established in 1998
Protected areas of Milwaukee County, Wisconsin
Tourist attractions in Milwaukee
1998 establishments in Wisconsin